Appaleptoneta is a genus of North American Leptonetids that was first described by Norman I. Platnick in 1986.

Species
 it contains seven species, all found in the United States:
Appaleptoneta barrowsi (Gertsch, 1974) – USA
Appaleptoneta coma (Barrows, 1940) – USA
Appaleptoneta credula (Gertsch, 1974) – USA
Appaleptoneta fiskei (Gertsch, 1974) – USA
Appaleptoneta gertschi (Barrows, 1940) – USA
Appaleptoneta jonesi (Gertsch, 1974) – USA
Appaleptoneta silvicultrix (Crosby & Bishop, 1925) (type) – USA

See also
 List of Leptonetidae species

References

Araneomorphae genera
Leptonetidae
Spiders of the United States